Laney is a surname. Notable people with the surname include:

Al Laney (Albert Gillis Laney; 1896–1988), American sportswriter
Benjamin Lany  or Laney (1591–1675), Bishop of Ely
Benjamin Travis Laney (1896–1977), former Democratic Governor of Arkansas
Betnijah Laney (born 1993), American basketball player
Bill Laney (William Ross Laney; 1913–1998), New Zealand politician
Brendan Laney (born 1973), professional rugby union player
Chris Laney, bassist/guitarist and former member of Whiskeytown
Danielle Laney, 1992 Olympic bronze medalist in taekwondo
David Laney (born 1949), Amtrak board chairman
Deanna Laney, American murderer
Francis Towner Laney, influential member of science fiction fandom and editor of the Hugo Award nominee The Acolyte
James T. Laney (born 1927), educator and ambassador
Jason Laney (born 1973), English cricketer
John Laney (died 1633), English politician
Lucy Craft Laney (1854–1933), African-American educator
Malcolm Laney (1910–1985), American basketball coach
Pete Laney (James Earl Laney; born 1943), American Democratic politician